In optimization theory, maximum flow problems involve finding a feasible flow through a flow network that obtains the maximum possible flow rate.

The maximum flow problem can be seen as a special case of more complex network flow problems, such as the circulation problem. The maximum value of an s-t flow (i.e., flow from source s to sink t) is equal to the minimum capacity of an s-t cut (i.e., cut severing s from t) in the network, as stated in the max-flow min-cut theorem.

History
The maximum flow problem was first formulated in 1954 by T. E. Harris and F. S. Ross as a simplified model of Soviet railway traffic flow.
In 1955, Lester R. Ford, Jr. and Delbert R. Fulkerson created the first known algorithm, the Ford–Fulkerson algorithm. In their 1955 paper, Ford and Fulkerson wrote that the problem of Harris and Ross is formulated as follows (see p. 5):Consider a rail network connecting two cities by way of a number of intermediate cities, where each link of the network has a number assigned to it representing its capacity. Assuming a steady state condition, find a maximal flow from one given city to the other.In their book Flows in Network, in 1962, Ford and Fulkerson wrote:It was posed to the authors in the spring of 1955 by T. E. Harris, who, in conjunction with General F. S. Ross (Ret.), had formulated a simplified model of railway traffic flow, and pinpointed this particular problem as the central one suggested by the model [11].where [11] refers to the 1955 secret report Fundamentals of a Method for Evaluating Rail net Capacities by Harris and Ross (see p. 5).

Over the years, various improved solutions to the maximum flow problem were discovered, notably the shortest augmenting path algorithm of Edmonds and Karp and independently Dinitz; the blocking flow algorithm of Dinitz; the push-relabel algorithm of Goldberg and Tarjan; and the binary blocking flow algorithm of Goldberg and Rao. The algorithms of Sherman and Kelner, Lee, Orecchia and Sidford, respectively, find an approximately optimal maximum flow but only work in undirected graphs.

In 2013 James B. Orlin published a paper describing an  algorithm.

For the single-source shortest path (SSSP) problem with negative weights another particular case of minimum-cost flow problem an algorithm in almost-linear time has also been reported. Both algorithms were deemed best papers at the 2022 Symposium on Foundations of Computer Science.

Definition

First we establish some notation:
 Let  be a network with  being the source and the sink of  respectively. 

Definition. The capacity of an edge is the maximum amount of flow that can pass through an edge. Formally it is a map 

Definition. A flow is a map  that satisfies the following:
Capacity constraint. The flow of an edge cannot exceed its capacity, in other words:  for all 
 Conservation of flows. The sum of the flows entering a node must equal the sum of the flows exiting that node, except for the source and the sink. Or:

Remark. Flows are skew symmetric:  for all 

Definition. The value of flow is the amount of flow passing from the source to the sink. Formally for a flow  it is given by:

Definition. The maximum flow problem is to route as much flow as possible from the source to the sink, in other words find the flow  with maximum value.

Note that several maximum flows may exist, and if arbitrary real (or even arbitrary rational) values of flow are permitted (instead of just integers), there is either exactly one maximum flow, or infinitely many, since there are infinitely many linear combinations of the base maximum flows. If flow values can be any real or rational numbers, then there are infinitely many such  values for each pair .

Algorithms
The following table lists algorithms for solving the maximum flow problem.
Here,  and  denote the number of vertices and edges of the network.
The value  refers to the largest edge capacity after rescaling all capacities to integer values
(if the network contains irrational capacities,  may be infinite).

For additional algorithms, see .

Integral flow theorem
The integral flow theorem states that
 If each edge in a flow network has integral capacity, then there exists an integral maximal flow.

The claim is not only that the value of the flow is an integer, which follows directly from the max-flow min-cut theorem, but that the flow on every edge is integral. This is crucial for many combinatorial applications (see below), where the flow across an edge may encode whether the item corresponding to that edge is to be included in the set sought or not.

Application

Multi-source multi-sink maximum flow problem

Given a network  with a set of sources  and a set of sinks  instead of only one source and one sink, we are to find the maximum flow across .

Maximum cardinality bipartite matching

This problem can be transformed into a maximum flow problem by constructing a network , where
  for each  (See Fig. 4.3.1).

Minimum path cover in directed acyclic graph
 
 
 .

Therefore, the problem can be solved by finding the maximum cardinality matching in  instead.

To see that  is vertex-disjoint, consider the following:

To show that the cover  has size , we start with an empty cover and build it incrementally. To add a vertex  to the cover, we can either add it to an existing path, or create a new path of length zero starting at that vertex. The latter case is always applicable. In the former case, the total number of edges in the cover is increased by 1 and the number of paths stays the same; in the latter case the number of paths is increased and the number of edges stays the same.

Maximum flow with vertex capacities

Let  be a network. Suppose there is capacity at each node in addition to edge capacity, that is, a mapping  such that the flow  has to satisfy not only the capacity constraint and the conservation of flows, but also the vertex capacity constraint

In other words, the amount of flow passing through a vertex cannot exceed its capacity. To find the maximum flow across , we can transform the problem into the maximum flow problem in the original sense by expanding . In this expanded network, the vertex capacity constraint is removed and therefore the problem can be treated as the original maximum flow problem.

Maximum number of paths from s to t
This problem has several variants:

1. The paths must be edge-disjoint. In this network, the maximum flow is  iff there are  edge-disjoint paths.

2.

3. In addition to the paths being edge-disjoint and/or vertex disjoint, the paths also have a length constraint: we count only paths whose length is exactly , or at most .

Closure problem 

A closure of a directed graph is a set of vertices C, such that no edges leave C. The closure problem is the task of finding the maximum-weight or minimum-weight closure in a vertex-weighted directed graph. It may be solved in polynomial time using a reduction to the maximum flow problem.

Real world applications

Baseball elimination

In the baseball elimination problem there are n teams competing in a league. At a specific stage of the league season, wi is the number of wins and ri is the number of games left to play for team i and rij is the number of games left against team j. A team is eliminated if it has no chance to finish the season in the first place. The task of the baseball elimination problem is to determine which teams are eliminated at each point during the season. Schwartz proposed a method which reduces this problem to maximum network flow. In this method a network is created to determine whether team k is eliminated.

Let G = (V, E) be a network with  being the source and the sink respectively. One adds a game nodeij – which represents the number of plays between these two teams. We also add a team node for each team and connect each game node  with i < j to V, and connects each of them from s by an edge with capacity rij – which represents the number of plays between these two teams. We also add a team node for each team and connect each game node  with two team nodes i and j to ensure one of them wins. One does not need to restrict the flow value on these edges.
Let S be the set of all teams participating in the league and let 
. 
In this method it is claimed team k is not eliminated if and only if a flow value of size r(S − {k}) exists in network G. In the mentioned article it is proved that this flow value is the maximum flow value from s to t.

Airline scheduling
In the airline industry a major problem is the scheduling of the flight crews. The airline scheduling problem can be considered as an application of extended maximum network flow. The input of this problem is a set of flights F which contains the information about where and when each flight departs and arrives. In one version of airline scheduling the goal is to produce a feasible schedule with at most k crews.

To solve this problem one uses a variation of the circulation problem called bounded circulation which is the generalization of network flow problems, with the added constraint of a lower bound on edge flows.

For the source and destination of every flight i, one adds two nodes to V, node si as the source and node di as the destination node of flight i. One also adds the following edges to E:
 An edge with capacity [0, 1] between s and each si.
 An edge with capacity [0, 1] between each di and t.
 An edge with capacity [1, 1] between each pair of si and di.
 An edge with capacity [0, 1] between each di and sj, if source sj is reachable with a reasonable amount of time and cost from the destination of flight i.
 An edge with capacity [0, ∞] between s and t.

In the mentioned method, it is claimed and proved that finding a flow value of k in G between s and t is equal to finding a feasible schedule for flight set F with at most k crews.

Another version of airline scheduling is finding the minimum needed crews to perform all the flights. A matching in  induces a schedule for F and obviously maximum bipartite matching in this graph produces an airline schedule with minimum number of crews. As it is mentioned in the Application part of this article, the maximum cardinality bipartite matching is an application of maximum flow problem.

Circulation–demand problem
There are some factories that produce goods and some villages where the goods have to be delivered. They are connected by a networks of roads with each road having a capacity  for maximum goods that can flow through it. The problem is to find if there is a circulation that satisfies the demand.
This problem can be transformed into a maximum-flow problem.
 Add a source node  and add edges from it to every factory node  with capacity  where  is the production rate of factory .
Let G = (V, E) be this new network. There exists a circulation that satisfies the demand if and only if :
  .
If there exists a circulation, looking at the max-flow solution would give the answer as to how much goods have to be sent on a particular road for satisfying the demands.

The problem can be extended by adding a lower bound on the flow on some edges.

Image segmentation 

In their book, Kleinberg and Tardos present an algorithm for segmenting an image. They present an algorithm to find the background and the foreground in an image. More precisely, the algorithm takes a bitmap as an input modelled as follows: ai ≥ 0 is the likelihood that pixel i belongs to the foreground, bi ≥ 0 in the likelihood that pixel i belongs to the background, and pij is the penalty if two adjacent pixels i and j are placed one in the foreground and the other in the background. The goal is to find a partition (A, B) of the set of pixels that maximize the following quantity

,

Indeed, for pixels in A (considered as the foreground), we gain ai; for all pixels in B (considered as the background), we gain bi. On the border, between two adjacent pixels i and j, we loose pij. It is equivalent to minimize the quantity

because

We now construct the network whose nodes are the pixel, plus a source and a sink, see Figure on the right. We connect the source to pixel i by an edge of weight ai.  We connect the pixel i to the sink by an edge of weight bi. We connect pixel i to pixel j with weight pij. Now, it remains to compute a minimum cut in that network (or equivalently a maximum flow). The last figure shows a minimum cut.

Extensions 
1. In the minimum-cost flow problem, each edge (u,v) also has a cost-coefficient auv in addition to its capacity. If the flow through the edge is fuv, then the total cost is auvfuv.  It is required to find a flow of a given size d, with the smallest cost. In most variants, the cost-coefficients may be either positive or negative. There are various polynomial-time algorithms for this problem.

2. The maximum-flow problem can be augmented by disjunctive constraints: a negative disjunctive constraint says that a certain pair of edges cannot simultaneously have a nonzero flow; a positive disjunctive constraints says that, in a certain pair of edges, at least one must have a nonzero flow. With negative constraints, the problem becomes strongly NP-hard even for simple networks. With positive constraints, the problem is polynomial if fractional flows are allowed, but may be strongly NP-hard when the flows must be integral.

References

Further reading
 
 
 

Network flow problem
Computational problems in graph theory